Home Movies is a 1979 independent film directed by Brian De Palma and starring Kirk Douglas, Nancy Allen, Vincent Gardenia, Keith Gordon, Theresa Saldana, and Gerrit Graham.

De Palma had been teaching film at his alma mater Sarah Lawrence College, and conceived this project as a hands-on training exercise for his students. They were given the primary responsibilities of raising money, arranging the shooting schedule, and editing the film, all under De Palma's supervision. Many of these students, such as Gilbert Adler, Sam Irvin, and Charlie Loventhal, went on to long careers of their own, producing and directing films.

Kirk Douglas plays a film instructor loosely modeled on the director himself. Keith Gordon is one of his pupils who films everything that happens at home. Many of the events that happen to Gordon's character were modeled on events from De Palma's own adolescence, particularly rivalry with a more favored brother, a mother prone to dramatic outbursts, and a philandering father.

Cast
 Kirk Douglas as The Maestro
 Vincent Gardenia as Dr. Byrd
 Nancy Allen as Kristina
 Keith Gordon as Denis Byrd
 Gerrit Graham as James Byrd
 Theresa Saldana as Judy

Reception
Fernando F. Croce of Slant Magazine awarded the film three stars out of four.

References

External links

Movie stills

Films directed by Brian De Palma
American comedy films
American independent films
1980 films
1980 comedy films
Films scored by Pino Donaggio
1980s English-language films
Films produced by Gilbert Adler
1980s American films